Monstrotyphis is a genus of sea snails, marine gastropod mollusks in the family Muricidae, the murex snails or rock snails.

Species
Species within the genus Monstrotyphis include:
 Monstrotyphis anapaulae Houart & Rosado, 2019
 Monstrotyphis bivaricata (Verco, 1909)
 Monstrotyphis carolinae (Houart, 1987)
 Monstrotyphis goniodes Houart, Gori & Rosado, 2017
 Monstrotyphis imperialis (Keen & Campbell, 1964)
 Monstrotyphis jardinreinensis (Espinosa, 1985)
 Monstrotyphis montfortii (A. Adams, 1863)
 Monstrotyphis pauperis (Mestayer, 1916)
 Monstrotyphis sera Garrigues, 2021
 Monstrotyphis singularis Houart, 2002
 Monstrotyphis takashigei Houart & Chino, 2016
 Monstrotyphis tangaroa Houart & Marshall, 2012
 Monstrotyphis teramachii (Keen & Campbell, 1964)
 Monstrotyphis tosaensis (Azuma, 1960)
 Monstrotyphis yatesi (Crosse & Fischer, 1865)

References

 Habe T. (1961). Coloured illustrations of the shells of Japan (II). Hoikusha, Osaka. xii + 183 + 42 pp., 66 pls.
 Houart, R.; Marshall, B. A. (2012). The Recent Typhinae (Gastropoda: Muricidae) of New Zealand. Molluscan Research. 32 (3): 137-144.

 
Typhinae